Serdar Dayat is a Turkish football manager, who last managed Türkgücü München.

He trained in German Sports University Cologne and has experience as the assistant coach of Thomas Doll, Ersun Yanal, Vladimir Petkovic, and Werner Lorant and as the head coach of Turkish, German, Bulgarian, and Swedish clubs. Dayat speaks German, English, Turkish, and French. Along with Mustafa Denizli, Şenol Güneş, Fatih Terim, Bülent Uygun, Oğuz Çetin, Güvenç Kurtar, Rasim Kara, Bülent Korkmaz, and Tayfun Korkut, Serdar Dayat is one of the few Turkish managers who has worked in a foreign country as a head coach. He holds a UEFA Pro License.

References

External links

Turkish football managers
1969 births
Living people
Turkish expatriate football managers
Expatriate football managers in Bulgaria
Expatriate football managers in Germany
Expatriate football managers in Sweden
Turkish expatriate sportspeople in Germany
Turkish expatriate sportspeople in Sweden
Denizlispor managers